Nexosa is a genus of moths belonging to the family Tortricidae.

Species
Nexosa aureola Diakonoff, 1977
Nexosa hexaphala Meyrick, 1912
Nexosa marmarastra Meyrick, 1932
Nexosa picturata Meyrick, 1912

References

tortricidae.com
 , 1977: A. Rearrangement of certain Glyphipterygidae sensu Meyrick, 1913, with descriptions of new taxa (Lepidoptera). Zoologische Verhandelingen 158: 1-55.
 , 2005, World Catalogue of Insects volume 5 Tortricidae

 
Archipini
Tortricidae genera
Taxa named by Alexey Diakonoff